Jarrad Sundqvist (born 11 December 1982) is an Australian rules footballer who played for Sydney between 2002 and 2003.

He was drafted in the 2000 AFL Draft with the 54th selection from the Glenelg Football Club in the South Australian National Football League.  He played nine games in three seasons at the Swans before he was delisted at the end of the 2005 season, having missed the entire 2004 season due to a knee injury.

References

External links

Living people
1982 births
Glenelg Football Club players
Sydney Swans players
Australian rules footballers from South Australia
Brighton Districts and Old Scholars Football Club players